Kevin Brown is an American comedian, film, and television actor, best known for his role on the series 30 Rock as "Dot Com".

Brown also appeared as the lead in Marq Overton's one-man play Die Laughing in 2008 at the Diversity Players of Harlem and as an actor and executive producer of the stage play Box (an off-Broadway play about four Haitian stowaways to America).

Filmography

References

Reagan, Gillian (February 19, 2008). "30 Rock's Kevin Brown to Die Laughing". The New York Observer.

External links

American male film actors
American male television actors
Living people
1972 births
African-American actors